Matt Bayles (born October 19, 1972) is an American record producer, mixer, engineer, and musician, based in Seattle, Washington. Bayles is known for his work with bands such as The Classic Crime, Isis, Soundgarden, Pearl Jam, Botch, Mastodon, Minus the Bear, Burnt by the Sun, and Norma Jean and as the keyboardist for American indie rock band, Minus the Bear.

Early years 
Bayles' career began with interning in Nashville, Tennessee. Eventually moving on to engineering country demo sessions with session musician, Bayles learned the ropes of the recording studio. After deciding Nashville wasn't the place to land, Bayles moved to Seattle, Washington.

Bayles began working with Brendan O'Brien, eventually assisting for O'Brien on Pearl Jam's No Code and Yield. Later, Bayles earned an assistant engineer credit on Deftones' Around The Fur after linking up with producer Terry Date.

Career
Bayles handled synthesizer and electronics in Seattle-based indie rock band Minus the Bear from the band's inception. He left them in January 2006 to focus on his production work. Following his departure from Minus the Bear, he produced two of their albums, Planet of Ice and Infinity Overhead.

Some of Bayles' early work includes producing, engineering, and mixing the seminal albums Oceanic by Isis and We Are the Romans by Botch. 

Later, he also produced and engineered Blood Mountain by Mastodon, which was one of the most critically acclaimed albums of 2006, ranking at 9th in Rolling Stone's Top 50 Albums of 2006. More recently, Bayles has worked with St. Louis indie rock band Foxing, handling the production and mixing of their 2015 LP, Dealer.

Selected discography 
p – produced, m – mixed, e – engineered, a – assistant

A Wilhelm Scream – A Wilhelm Scream (m)
Alice in Chains – Alice in Chains (a)
Botch – American Nervoso (p/m/e)
Botch – We Are the Romans (m/e)
Botch – An Anthology of Dead Ends (c-p/m/e)
Caspian – Waking Season (c-p/m/e)
Caspian – Hymn for the Greatest Generation (p/m/e)
Caspian – Dust & Disquiet (c-p/m/e)
Cursive – I Am Gemini (p)
Deftones – Around the Fur (a)
Fallow Land – Slow Down, Rockstar (p/m/e)
Foxing – Dealer (p/m)
Gibraltar – Storms (m)
Gibraltar – The New Century (p/m)
Gibraltar – Elegant Alibis EP (p/m/e)
Gibraltar – Lets Get Beautiful (p/m/e)
Isis – Celestial (p/m/e)
Isis – SGNL>05 (p/m/e)
Isis – Oceanic (p/m/e)
Isis – Panopticon (p/m/e)
Isis – In the Absence of Truth (p/m/e)
KEN mode – Entrench (p)
Make Do and Mend – End Measure Mile (m)
Make Do and Mend – Everything You Ever Loved (p/m/e)
Mastodon – Remission (p/m/e)
Mastodon – Leviathan (p/m/e)
Mastodon – Blood Mountain (p/e)
Meg Myers  – Sorry (e)
Minus The Bear – They Make Beer Commercials Like This (p/m/e)
Minus the Bear – Menos El Oso (p/m/e)
Minus the Bear – Planet of Ice (p/m/e)
Minus the Bear – Infinity Overhead (p w/ band)
Murder City Devils – Thelema (p/m/e)
Norma Jean – O God, the Aftermath (p/m/e)
Norma Jean – Masters of Horror (Soundtrack) (p/m/e "Shaunlulu")
Nothink – Hidden State (p/m/e)
Pearl Jam – Yield (e "Do the Evolution" & "All Those Yesterdays")
Pearl Jam – Binaural (e)
Pearl Jam – Lost Dogs (m)
Polar Bear Club – Chasing Hamburg (p/m/e)
Screaming Females – Rose Mountain (c-p)
Screaming Females – All at Once (c-p/m)
Soundgarden – Down on the Upside (a)
Soundgarden – The Classic Album Selection (e)
The Blood Brothers – This Adultery Is Ripe (p/m/e)
The Blood Brothers – March On Electric Children (p/m/e)
The Classic Crime – Seattle Sessions (p)
The Fall of Troy – Manipulator (p/m/e)
The Sword – Warp Riders (p/m/e)
These Arms Are Snakes – This Is Meant to Hurt You'' (p/m/e)
These Arms Are Snakes – Oxeneers or  The Lions Sleeps When It's Antelope Go Home (p/m/e)
Vanna – Curses (p/m/e)

References

External links
 Mattbayles.com – Bayles' official website
 Red Room Studios – Red Room Studios website

1972 births
Living people
Record producers from Washington (state)
Mixing engineers
Minus the Bear members
Businesspeople from Seattle